La Chapelle-Hugon is a commune in the Cher department in the Centre-Val de Loire region of France.

Geography

Population

Sights
 The church of Saintes Etienne and Martin, dating from the twelfth century
 A watermill
 The seventeenth-century chateau des Bordes.

See also
Communes of the Cher department

References

External links

Website of La Chapelle-Hugon 

Communes of Cher (department)